In geometry, a point group is a mathematical group of symmetry operations (isometries in a Euclidean space) that have a fixed point in common. The coordinate origin of the Euclidean space is conventionally taken to be a fixed point, and every point group in dimension d is then a subgroup of the orthogonal group O(d). Point groups are used to describe the  symmetries of geometric figures and physical objects such as molecules. 

Each point group can be represented as sets of orthogonal matrices M that transform point x into point y according to y = Mx. Each element of a point group is either a rotation (determinant of M = 1), or it is a reflection or improper rotation (determinant of M = −1).

The geometric symmetries of crystals are described by space groups, which allow translations and contain point groups as subgroups. Discrete point groups in more than one dimension come in infinite families, but from the crystallographic restriction theorem and one of Bieberbach's theorems, each number of dimensions has only a finite number of point groups that are symmetric over some lattice or grid with that number of dimensions. These are the crystallographic point groups.

Chiral and achiral point groups, reflection groups
Point groups can be classified into chiral (or purely rotational) groups and achiral groups.
The chiral groups are subgroups of the special orthogonal group SO(d): they contain only orientation-preserving orthogonal transformations, i.e., those of determinant +1. The achiral groups contain also transformations of determinant −1. In an achiral group, the orientation-preserving transformations form a (chiral) subgroup of index 2.

Finite Coxeter groups or reflection groups are those point groups that are generated purely by a set of reflectional mirrors passing through the same point. A rank n Coxeter group has n mirrors and is represented by a Coxeter-Dynkin diagram. Coxeter notation offers a bracketed notation equivalent to the Coxeter diagram, with markup symbols for rotational and other subsymmetry point groups. Reflection groups are necessarily achiral (except for the trivial group containing only the identity element).

List of point groups

One dimension
There are only two one-dimensional point groups, the identity group and the reflection group.

Two dimensions
Point groups in two dimensions, sometimes called rosette groups.

They come in two infinite families:
 Cyclic groups Cn of n-fold rotation groups
 Dihedral groups Dn of n-fold rotation and reflection groups
Applying the crystallographic restriction theorem restricts n to values 1, 2, 3, 4, and 6 for both families, yielding 10 groups.

The subset of pure reflectional point groups, defined by 1 or 2 mirrors, can also be given by their Coxeter group and related polygons. These include 5 crystallographic groups. The symmetry of the reflectional groups can be doubled by an isomorphism, mapping both mirrors onto each other by a bisecting mirror, doubling the symmetry order.

Three dimensions

Point groups in three dimensions, sometimes called molecular point groups after their wide use in studying symmetries of molecules.

They come in 7 infinite families of axial groups (also called prismatic), and 7 additional polyhedral groups (also called Platonic). In Schönflies notation,
 Axial groups: Cn,  S2n, Cnh,  Cnv, Dn, Dnd, Dnh
 Polyhedral groups: T, Td, Th, O, Oh, I, Ih
Applying the crystallographic restriction theorem to these groups yields the 32 crystallographic point groups.

Reflection groups 

The reflection point groups, defined by 1 to 3 mirror planes, can also be given by their Coxeter group and related polyhedra.

Four dimensions 

The  four-dimensional point groups (chiral as well as achiral) are listed in Conway and Smith, Section 4, Tables 4.1-4.3.

The following list gives the four-dimensional reflection groups (excluding those that leave a subspace fixed and that are therefore lower-dimensional reflection groups). Each group is specified as a Coxeter group, and like the polyhedral groups of 3D, it can be named by its related convex regular 4-polytope. Related pure rotational groups exist for each with half the order, and can be represented by the bracket Coxeter notation with a '+' exponent, for example [3,3,3]+ has three 3-fold gyration points and symmetry order 60. Front-back symmetric groups like [3,3,3] and [3,4,3] can be doubled, shown as double brackets in Coxeter's notation, for example  with its order doubled to 240.

Five dimensions 

The following table gives the five-dimensional reflection groups (excluding those that are lower-dimensional reflection groups), by listing them as Coxeter groups. Related chiral groups exist for each with half the order, and can be represented by the bracket Coxeter notation with a '+' exponent, for example [3,3,3,3]+ has four 3-fold gyration points and symmetry order 360.

Six dimensions 

The following table gives the six-dimensional reflection groups (excluding those that are lower-dimensional reflection groups), by listing them as Coxeter groups. Related pure rotational groups exist for each with half the order, and can be represented by the bracket Coxeter notation with a '+' exponent, for example [3,3,3,3,3]+ has five 3-fold gyration points and symmetry order 2520.

Seven dimensions 
The following table gives the seven-dimensional reflection groups (excluding those that are lower-dimensional reflection groups), by listing them as Coxeter groups. Related chiral groups exist for each with half the order, defined by an even number of reflections, and can be represented by the bracket Coxeter notation with a '+' exponent, for example [3,3,3,3,3,3]+ has six 3-fold gyration points and symmetry order 20160.

Eight dimensions 
The following table gives the eight-dimensional reflection groups (excluding those that are lower-dimensional reflection groups), by listing them as Coxeter groups. Related chiral groups exist for each with half the order, defined by an even number of reflections, and can be represented by the bracket Coxeter notation with a '+' exponent, for example [3,3,3,3,3,3,3]+ has seven 3-fold gyration points and symmetry order 181440.

See also
Point groups in two dimensions
Point groups in three dimensions
Point groups in four dimensions
Crystallography
Crystallographic point group
Molecular symmetry
Space group
X-ray diffraction
Bravais lattice
Infrared spectroscopy of metal carbonyls

References

Further reading 
 H. S. M. Coxeter: Kaleidoscopes: Selected Writings of H. S. M. Coxeter, edited by F. Arthur Sherk, Peter McMullen, Anthony C. Thompson, Asia Ivic Weiss, Wiley-Interscience Publication, 1995,  
 (Paper 23) H. S. M. Coxeter, Regular and Semi-Regular Polytopes II, [Math. Zeit. 188 (1985) 559–591]
 H. S. M. Coxeter and W. O. J. Moser. Generators and Relations for Discrete Groups 4th ed, Springer-Verlag. New York. 1980
 N. W. Johnson: Geometries and Transformations, (2018) Chapter 11: Finite symmetry groups

External links
Web-based point group tutorial (needs Java and Flash)
Subgroup enumeration (needs Java)
 The Geometry Center: 2.1 Formulas for Symmetries in Cartesian Coordinates (two dimensions)
 The Geometry Center: 10.1 Formulas for Symmetries in Cartesian Coordinates (three dimensions)

Crystallography
Euclidean symmetries
Group theory